The Queen Victoria Monument stands in the centre of Hamilton Square, Birkenhead, Wirral, Merseyside, England.  It is in the form of an Eleanor cross.  The memorial was designed by Edmund Kirby, and was unveiled in 1905.  It is recorded in the National Heritage List for England as a designated Grade II listed building.

History

Following the death of Queen Victoria in 1901, a Victoria Memorial Committee was established in Birkenhead to make arrangements for a memorial to the queen.  An open space was created in the centre of Hamilton Square in 1903 by Birkenhead Town Council.  The committee then discussed the form of the memorial to stand in its centre.  It had been hoped to have a monument in bronze, but the amount of money raised was inadequate to provide this, and it was decided that the monument should be in the form of an Eleanor cross.

Eleanor crosses were erected by King Edward I in the late 13th century to commemorate the life of his wife, Eleanor of Castile, and were erected on the sites where her coffin rested.  The typical design of an Eleanor cross was that of a polygonal base on steps, surmounted by stages of reducing size.  The lowest stage was solid, and the upper stages were open.  The committee considered that this would be appropriate as a it would follow the design of a memorial to an admired queen.  One of the members of the committee was the architect Edmund Kirby, who agreed to design the memorial free of charge.  The identity of the sculptor is not recorded.  Kirby had previously worked with Richard Boulton and Sons of Cheltenham, and it is possible that this was the responsible company.  The monument was unveiled, before it was finished, by Charles Gatehouse, a local politician and a member of the committee, on 26 October 1905.  It cost £1,400.

Description

The monument is constructed in sandstone from Darley Dale. The steps on which it stands, and the columns in the second and third stages are in granite from Newry. It is in Gothic style. Each stage of the monument is octagonal. It stands on five steps, and consists of four stages, each stage being narrower than the stage below. The lowest stage is solid, and each side has a gabled canopy. In the front is an inscription reading as follows.

Each of the other sides contains a coat of arms in relief, and its associated motto.  In clockwise order from the front these are the arms and mottoes of Birkenhead, Cheshire, Wales, Ireland, Scotland, England, and the Royal arms.  The middle two stages of the monument are open, with arcades and granite columns, and the top stage consists of a crocketed spire surmounted by a crown finial.

Appraisal

The memorial was designated a Grade II listed building on 28 March 1974.  Grade II is the lowest of the three grades of listing and is applied to "buildings of national importance and special interest".

See also

Listed buildings in Birkenhead

Notes and references
Notes

Citations

Sources

 
 

Queen Victoria Monument
Grade II listed buildings in Merseyside
Buildings and structures completed in 1905
Gothic Revival architecture in Merseyside
Monuments and memorials to Queen Victoria
Monuments and memorials in Merseyside
Grade II listed monuments and memorials
1905 establishments in England